Vrakuňa, is a borough of Bratislava,  Slovakia. It is divided by into two parts by the Little Danube river.

Transport 
 Buses
 Line 
 Line 
 Line 
 Line 
 Line 
 Line 
 Trolleybuses
 Line 
 Line 
 Night buses
 Line 
 Night trolleybuses
 Line

Names and etymology 

The first written mention of Vrakuňa was in 1279 as a village named Werekne. Some other recorded medieval names are Verekene (1290), Frecendorf (1297), Verekuna (1323), Oluerekenye (1356),  Berekenye in theutonico Fratedorf (1393) or Vraknye (1459).

The name is probably derived from a Proto-Slavic appelative *vrakunъ, potentially reflecting Pre-Christian (pagan) rituals. The stem vra- means "to speak without making any sense", vrakúň – a wizzard, preserved in Russian as вракун/vrakun – a liar, a gossip). Lajos Kiss (1988) tried to drive the name from Proto-Slavic vir- (a whirl). Šimon Ondruš (1990) from  Proto-Slavic vorkъ (in East Slavic languages: vorok - a fence, a barrier) like  Vorkonъ, Vorkunovka and other similar names, but documented only for the East Slavs.

History
Vrakuňa became an official borough of Bratislava on January 1, 1972.

References

Boroughs of Bratislava